Beli Ram Das (October 1908 – 14 January 1969) was an Indian politician who was elected to the Lok Sabha, lower house of the Parliament of India from the Barpeta constituency Assam in 1952. He was also a member of the Assam Legislative Assembly.

References

External links
Profile on Lok Sabha website

1908 births
1969 deaths
India MPs 1952–1957
Indian National Congress politicians from Assam
Lok Sabha members from Assam
People from Barpeta